Jean Ferrier or Juan Ferrer (died 1521) was a Roman Catholic prelate who served as Archbishop of Arles (1499–1521) and Bishop of Melfi (1498–1499).

Biography
On 3 December 1498, Jean Ferrier was appointed Bishop of Melfi by Pope Alexander VI.
On 26 July 1499, he was appointed during the papacy of Pope Alexander VI as Archbishop of Arles.

He served as Archbishop of Arles until his death on 17 January 1521.

While bishop, he was the principal consecrator of Guillaume de Pélissier, Bishop of Orange (1510).

References

External links and additional sources
 (for Chronology of Bishops) 
 (for Chronology of Bishops) 
 (for Chronology of Bishops) 
 (for Chronology of Bishops) 

16th-century Roman Catholic archbishops in France
15th-century Italian Roman Catholic bishops
Bishops appointed by Pope Alexander VI
1521 deaths